There Are Giants in the Earth is the only album recorded by The '89 Cubs, a band from Omaha, Nebraska. It was released October 26, 2004 on Slowdance Records.

Track listing
 Candid Flames - 5:37
 Oh, The Things We Put in Our Heads - 3:36
 Sorry Tornado - 6:14
 How to Prepare for Death - 3:07 
 Code of Conduct: Ghosts - 6:56
 We Won the Party - 1:58
 Unpopular Meals - 2:54
 Treason Parade Hat- Wearers - 0:59
 Birthday Bloodline - 4:34
 Burn the Boats - 1:31

External links
The '89 Cubs official website
There are Giants in the Earth at Amazon.com

2004 debut albums